Simone Gonin (born 23 August 1989) is an Italian curler from Pinerolo.

He represented Italy at the 2018 and 2022 Winter Olympics.

He was ejected from a game against the Czech Republic at the 2022 World Men's Curling Championship after smashing his broom. The head of the brush popped off, and landed on the adjacent sheet in front of U.S. skip Korey Dropkin while he was throwing. Gonin was apologetic when he retrieved his brush head, and Dropkin made his shot anyway.  Despite the incident, Gonin was awarded the Collie Campbell Memorial Award for sportsmanship at the event. The Italian team also won the bronze medal that year, the first medal for Italy at the World Men's Championship.

Personal life
Gonin is employed as a curling instructor and manager.

References

External links

1989 births
Living people
Italian male curlers
Olympic curlers of Italy
Curlers at the 2018 Winter Olympics
People from Pinerolo
People from Savigliano
Curlers at the 2022 Winter Olympics
Sportspeople from the Metropolitan City of Turin
Sportspeople from the Province of Cuneo